The 1852 United States presidential election in North Carolina took place on November 2, 1852, as part of the 1852 United States presidential election. Voters chose 10 representatives, or electors to the Electoral College, who voted for President and Vice President.

North Carolina voted for the Democratic candidate, Franklin Pierce, over Whig candidate Winfield Scott. Pierce won North Carolina by a margin of 0.94%.

Results

References

North Carolina
1852
1852 North Carolina elections